Brachy is a commune in the Seine-Maritime department in the Normandy region in northern France.

Geography

Population

Places of interest
 Two ancient manorhouses.
 The church of St. Martin, dating from the twelfth century.
 The seventeenth century church of St. Ouen.
 The church of St. Remy, at Gourel, dating from the eleventh century.
 A stone cross from the fifteenth century.

See also
Communes of the Seine-Maritime department

References

Communes of Seine-Maritime